was a Japanese translator, writer and scholar. Living a large part of his life in Seville, Spain, he co-founded the Japanese department of the University of Seville Languages Institute with Francisco García Tortosa.

Life
Born in Yonago, Tottori, Nagakawa was forced to study Russian at age 13, which led to an interest in literature. During his student life he was a classmate of the Japanese Nobel prize awarded writer Kenzaburō Ōe.

During World War II he served in the Japanese Imperial Army. In 1945 he was wanted to become a kamikaze pilot, but the war finished before he was able to enter military school. His family lived with the effects of the Hiroshima atomic bomb.

After the war he became a pacifist and criticized extreme nationalism. Within the Japanese academic community he was called "the Korean Christ" because of his defense of the Korean people; his political position led him to turn down a chair in English Literature at the University of Tokyo.

At the end of the Sixties he emigrated to England, where for a brief period he was a professor at the University of Cambridge. Shortly thereafter he traveled to Spain, establishing himself for the long term in the city of Seville. There he became acquainted with numerous professors and Sevillian artists like Fernando Rodríguez-Izquierdo Gávala, José María Cabeza Laínez, Pablo del Barco and Vicente Haya Segovia. Between 1988 and 1992 he became a senior instructor of Japanese in the University of Seville.

In 1999 an invitation by the University of Kitakyushu led to his return to Japan. He fell ill during a trip to Korea, and died in Tokyo of a brain hemorrhage on April 22, 2000.

Work
Nagakawa's most notable translations include the Japanese version of James Joyce's Ulysses (together with Maruya Saiichi and Takamatsu Yuuichi), and works of William Shakespeare, John Dos Passos and Vidiadhar Surajprasad Naipaul. He was the author of Kotoba no Seijigaku ("The policies of language", 1979) and Andalucia Fudoki ("Old History of Andalusia", 1999). He also appeared in the films Madre in Japan and El museo japonés.

1928 births
2000 deaths
English–Japanese translators
Japanese expatriates in Spain
Writers from Tottori Prefecture
20th-century Japanese translators
People from Yonago, Tottori
Imperial Japanese Army personnel of World War II